Two human polls comprised the 1951 National Collegiate Athletic Association (NCAA) football rankings. Unlike most sports, college football's governing body, the NCAA, does not bestow a national championship, instead that title is bestowed by one or more different polling agencies. There are two main weekly polls that begin in the preseason—the AP Poll and the Coaches Poll.

Legend

AP Poll
The final AP Poll was released on December 3, at the end of the 1951 regular season, weeks before the major bowls. The AP would not release a post-bowl season final poll regularly until 1968.

Final Coaches Poll
The final UP Coaches Poll was released prior to the bowl games, on 
Tennessee received 23 of the 35 first-place votes; Michigan State received seven, Maryland two, and one each to Illinois, Georgia Tech, 

 Prior to the 1975 season, the Big Ten and Pacific Coast (later AAWU / Pac-8) conferences allowed only one postseason participant each, for the Rose Bowl.
 The Ivy League has prohibited its members from participating in postseason football since the league was officially formed in 1954.

References

College football rankings